This is a list of finalists for the 2007 Archibald Prize for portraiture.

Martin Ball – Mark McClean 
Del Kathryn Barton – Vasili Kaliman and contained familiar together within the Dreaming  
John Beard – Janet Laurence  (Winner of the 2007 Archibald Prize)
Danelle Bergstrom – Take two – Jack Thompson  (Winner of the 2007 Packing Room Prize)
Adam Chang – Brian, the dog and the doorway  (Portrait of Brian Sherman)
Zhong Chen –  Self portrait  
Peteris Ciemitis –  Making sense of place #4  (Portrait of Prof George Seddon)
Kevin Connor – Portrait of a quiet man, Robert Eadie, painter  
Sam Cranstoun –  Peter  (Portrait of artist’s father)
Darren Crothers – Black sheep of the family  (Self-portrait)
Lucy Culliton – Self with subject (domestic science)  (Self-portrait)
Carmen Di Napoli – Go for it  (Portrait of Morris Iemma)
McLean Edwards – Martin Browne  
Esther Erlich –  Tim  (Portrait of Tim Rogers
Vivian Falk – A moment with Malcolm  (Portrait of Malcolm Turnbull)
David Griggs – The bleeding hearts club #1 (self portrait) 
Robert Hannaford – Tubes  (Self-portrait)
Daniel Henderson – Lily-Rose  (Portrait of artist’s daughter)
Cherry Hood – Ben Quilty  
Peter Hudson –  Words and music – portrait of Paul Kelly 
Jasper Knight – The Honourable Bob Carr  
Zai Kuang –  Sarah and the doll  
Sam Leach – A bird flies past Jeff Kennett 
Bill Leak –  Portrait of Paul  (Portrait of Paul LePetit)
Mathew Lynn –  Neville Wran 
Abbey McCulloch – Toni Collette 
Alexander McKenzie – McLean Edwards 
Lewis Miller –  Allan, Matisse and me  (Portrait of Allan Mitelman)
Michael Mucci –  The power and the passion  (Portrait of Peter Garrett)
Angus Nivison – Myself  (Self-portrait)
Chris (aka Reg Mombassa) O'Doherty –  Self portrait with high pants 
Paulson David – Michael Nelson Jagamara and totem (with Michael Nelson Jagamara)  
Evert Ploeg – George Ellis  (Winner of the 2007 People's Choice Award)
Rodney Pople – Stone cold sober (self portrait)  
Paul Ryan – Fink on the phone  (Portrait of Margaret Fink)
Jenny Sages – Irina Baronova (handing on the baton)  
Peter Smeeth – The young diva – A portrait of Amelia Farrugia 
Sue Taylor –  eX and reg  
Ian Waldron – Imants Tillers  
Xu Wang –  John Yu and George Soutter 
Greg Warburton – Faith Bandler

See also 
List of Archibald Prize 2006 finalists
List of Archibald Prize 2008 finalists
List of Archibald Prize winners

External links
 Archibald Prize 2007 finalists official website

2007
Arch
Archibald Prize 2007
Archibald Prize 2007
2007 in art
Arch
Archibald